William Thongrasamy (born 19 August 1982), known under the pseudonym Willy Denzey, is a Contemporary R&B and soul French-born singer of Laotian origin.

Biography
Denzey was born in Melun, France, and spent his childhood in Le Mée-sur-Seine. At 15, he formed with his friends a band named Prodyge. In June 2000, he participated in the broadcast Graines de star and reached the final. A producer noticed him and proposed him to release a disc. In 2001, Denzey participated in the Francofolies of La Rochelle, then in 2002 released his first single, "Que te dire".

Denzey released in May 2003 a second single, "Le mur du son", which earned a gold disc in France for over 300 000 copies sold. On 3 November 2003, he released his first album, # 1, in which many artists participated, including La Fouine, Diam's, Kader Riwan & Ol Kainry. His single "L'Orphelin" also become a top ten hit in France. Reloaded on 15 March 2004 with bonus track "Badaboom Remix" (French Version) (Feat B2K).

27 September 2004, Denzey released a new album entitled Act II, composed of hip-hop and R&B songs and romantic ballads, including a collaboration with Wayne Beckford, XS, Neje, Mathieu 8, Darren & Little D. Then he released in January 2005 the song "Et si tu n'existais pas", a cover of Joe Dassin. Inclus, "Hello" by Lionel Richie. Thereafter, Denzey toured throughout France.

He also performed the song "Double Mise (Bet on it)", used in the movie High School Musical 2, produced and broadcast by Disney Channel remixed par Kore (DJ Kore).

However, after the failure of his last single, "Mon Royaume" (Feat Eloquence), which did not appear on the chart, his third album (feat Amerie, Papoose, Marques Houston, Cassidy, Humphrey & co) originally scheduled to be released in Novembre 13th 2006, was cancelled. New single L'homme Qu'il Te Faut release 1 June 2012.

Discography

Albums

Singles

References

External links
Official site

1982 births
People from Melun
French hip hop musicians
Living people
French people of Laotian descent
21st-century French singers
21st-century French male singers